Amin Ghaseminejad is an Iranian professional footballer who plays as a forward for Persian Gulf Pro League club Gol Gohar.

References

1986 births
Living people
People from Babol
Iranian footballers
Association football forwards
Machine Sazi F.C. players
Giti Pasand players
Esteghlal F.C. players
Shahr Khodro F.C. players
Gol Gohar players
Persian Gulf Pro League players
Sportspeople from Mazandaran province